Alijan or Ali Jan may refer to:

People
Ali Jan Aurakzai, Pakistani general
Ali Jan Faizi (born 1977), Afghani footballer
Alijan Ibragimov, Uighur oligarch

Villages
Alijan, East Azerbaijan, in Bostanabad County, East Azerbaijan Province, Iran
Alijan, Divandarreh, Kurdistan Province 
Ali Jan, Sanandaj, Kurdistan Province
Ali Jan-e Pa'in, in the Central District of Birjand County, South Khorasan Province, Iran
Alijan Beygi, Qahan Rural District, Khalajastan District, Qom County, Qom Province, Iran
Qush-e Alijan, Central District of Sarakhs County, Razavi Khorasan Province, Iran

See also
Aali Jan
Ali Jaan
Alija
Aljan
Malijan (disambiguation)